The Specter Aircraft Specter II was an American homebuilt aircraft that was designed and produced by Specter Aircraft of Bancroft, Idaho, introduced in 1997. When it was available the aircraft was supplied as a kit for amateur construction.

Design and development
The Specter II featured a canard configuration, a cantilever high-wing, a two-seats-in-tandem enclosed cockpit, with the pilot under a bubble canopy and the passenger supplied only with side windows. The aircraft had fixed tricycle landing gear with a retractable nosewheel and a single engine in pusher configuration. The design was stall-resistant.

The aircraft was made from composite materials.

The fast-build kit was to include all the major structural parts bonded in place. The manufacturer estimated the construction time from the supplied kit to be 850 hours.

Operational history
By 1998 the company reported that one example had been completed and was flying.

In April 2015 one example was registered in the United States with the Federal Aviation Administration, although its registration had expired in 2013. It is unlikely any examples exist today.

Specifications (Specter II)

References

Specter II
1990s United States sport aircraft
1990s United States civil utility aircraft
Single-engined pusher aircraft
High-wing aircraft
Homebuilt aircraft
Canard aircraft